Daniel David is a Romanian professor.

Daniel or Dan David may also refer to:

Daniel Alexandru David (born 1983), Romanian footballer
Daniel David (media entrepreneur) (born 1966), media entrepreneur from Mozambique
Dan David (songwriter) (born 1977), Canadian violinist, musician, and songwriter
Dan David (businessman) (1929–2011), Romanian-born Israeli businessman and philanthropist
Dan David (money manager), American money manager and whistle-blower

See also

Dan David Prize